Hyposmocoma niveiceps is a species of moth of the family Cosmopterigidae. It was first described by Lord Walsingham in 1907. It is endemic to the Hawaiian islands of Molokai and Lanai.

External links

niveiceps
Endemic moths of Hawaii
Biota of Molokai
Moths described in 1907
Taxa named by Thomas de Grey, 6th Baron Walsingham